Halil Edhem Eldem, also known as Halil Edhem Bey (1861–1938) was an Ottoman conservative politician, archaeologist and writer during the Second Constitutional Era. He was the son of Ibrahim Edhem Pasha.

References 

1861 births
1938 deaths
Politicians of the Ottoman Empire